Elizabeth Bracco is an American actress best known for her role as Marie Spatafore, the wife of Vito Spatafore, on the HBO TV series The Sopranos.

Early life 
Elizabeth Bracco is a daughter of Eileen (née Molyneux) and Salvatore Bracco, Sr.  Salvatore was of Italian descent. Eileen was born in England and had French ancestry. They met during World War II. Eileen came with Salvatore to the US as a war bride. 

Bracco was raised on Long Island.She has a sister, the actress Lorraine Bracco, who was a main cast member on The Sopranos, and a brother, Salvatore, Jr.

Career 
Bracco has appeared in a number of other films, including Mystery Train, Louis & Frank, Trees Lounge, and The Impostors. She has played minor roles in the  movies The Color of Money, Stakeout, and Analyze This. 

On television, in addition to portraying Vito Spatafore's wife on The Sopranos, Bracco appeared in the pilot of the TV series Crime Story.

Personal life
In 1987, Bracco married her Stakeout co-star, Aidan Quinn. They have two daughters: Mia and Ava Eileen, who has autism.

Formerly residents of Englewood, New Jersey, Bracco and family reside in Palisades, Rockland County, New York and Marbletown in the Catskills / Woodstock region of Ulster County, New York.

References

External links

Year of birth missing (living people)
American television actresses
American people of British descent
American people of Italian descent
American people of French descent
Living people
People from Bay Ridge, Brooklyn
People from Englewood, New Jersey
People from Westbury, New York
21st-century American women
Place of birth missing (living people)